Eustathes is a genus of longhorn beetles of the subfamily Lamiinae.

 Eustathes celebensis Chemin, 2011
 Eustathes flava Newman, 1842
 Eustathes mindanaonis Vives, 2009
 Eustathes semiusta Pascoe, 1867

References

Astathini
Cerambycidae genera